Conrad-Starbuck House is a historic home located at Winston-Salem, Forsyth County, North Carolina.  It was built in 1884, and is a -story, three bay, double pile Italianate style brick dwelling. It has a number of rear additions. The central projecting bay once had a three-story tower, but the top level was removed between 1912 and 1917.

It was listed on the National Register of Historic Places in 1990. The property was purchased in 2019 by Spear Properties Group, with plans to renovate the house and surrounding land to fit historic roots. The house now serves as office suites for downtown Winston-Salem.

References

Houses on the National Register of Historic Places in North Carolina
Italianate architecture in North Carolina
Houses completed in 1884
Houses in Winston-Salem, North Carolina
National Register of Historic Places in Winston-Salem, North Carolina